Thoothukudi taluk is a taluk of Thoothukudi district of the Indian state of Tamil Nadu. The headquarters of the taluk is the town of Thoothukudi.

Demographics
According to the 2011 census, the taluk of Thoothukkudi had a population of 476,890 with 238,533 males and 238,357 females. There were 999 women for every 1,000 men. The taluk had a literacy rate of 81.9%. Child population in the age group below 6 years were 25,329 Males and 24,692 Females.

References 

Taluks of Thoothukudi district